This is a list of the TVB Star Awards Malaysia winners and nominees for My Favourite TVB Drama Series. It was first introduced in 2005 at the inaugural 2004 Astro Wah Lai Toi Drama Awards. The awards ceremony was renamed TVB Star Awards Malaysia in 2013.

Winners and nominees

2000s

2010s

References

TVB Star Award for Favourite Drama